The 2002 Women's Junior European Volleyball Championship was the 18th edition of the competition, with the main phase (contested between 12 teams) held in Croatia from 17 to 25 August 2002.

Qualification

Venues

Preliminary round

Pool I

|}

|}

Pool II

|}

|}

9th–12th classification

9th–12th semifinals

|}

11th place match

|}

9th place match

|}

5th–8th classification

5th–8th semifinals

|}

7th place match

|}

5th place match

|}

Final round

Semifinals

|}

3rd place match

|}

Final

|}

Final standing

References

Women's Junior European Volleyball Championship
Europe
Volley
International volleyball competitions hosted by Croatia